Ochirbat is a Mongolian personal name.

Prominent persons bearing this name:

Proper name 
 Gombojavyn Ochirbat, leader of the Mongolian People's Revolutionary Party in 1990–1991
 Punsalmaagiin Ochirbat (born 1942), President of Mongolia in 1990–1997
 Tsend-Ayuushiin Ochirbat (born 1974), Mongolian judoka

Patronymic 
 Ochirbatyn Dashbalbar (1957–1999), Mongolian writer and politician 
 Ochirbatyn Burmaa (born 1982), Mongolian female freestyle wrestler
 Ochirbatyn Nasanburmaa (born 1989), Mongolian female freestyle wrestler